David Parada Calvillo (born 8 March 1987) is a Spanish professional footballer who plays as a defensive midfielder.

Club career
Born in Seville, Andalusia, Parada finished his formation with neighbouring Cádiz CF, but he could never break into the first team. Released in 2009 he resumed his career in Segunda División B, with AD Ceuta, CD Badajoz, CD Teruel and Algeciras CF, being relegated with all the clubs except the first.

On 13 June 2014, aged 27, Parada moved abroad for the first time in his career, joining SKN St. Pölten in the Austrian Football First League on a two-year contract.

References

External links
 St. Pölten official profile 
 
 
 
 

1987 births
Living people
Footballers from Seville
Spanish footballers
Association football midfielders
Segunda División B players
Tercera División players
Cádiz CF B players
AD Ceuta footballers
CD Badajoz players
CD Teruel footballers
Algeciras CF footballers
2. Liga (Austria) players
SKN St. Pölten players
Spanish expatriate footballers
Expatriate footballers in Austria
Spanish expatriate sportspeople in Austria